CTF may refer to:

Organizations and associations 
 Cambridge Theological Federation
 Canadian Taxpayers Federation 
 Canadian Teachers' Federation
 Child Trust Fund, a UK child savings scheme
 Children's Tumor Foundation
 Clean Technology Fund
 Cyprus Tennis Federation
 Chow Tai Fook, Hong Kong based conglomerate

Science and technology 
 Capture the flag (cybersecurity), an educational exercise in computer security
 Charge trap flash
 Chlorine trifluoride, a highly corrosive chemical
 Collaborative Translation Framework, a platform designed by Microsoft to improve machine translation through (possibly crowdsourced) user contributions
 Computer to film, an imaging technology used in lithographic printing
 Contrast threshold function, in physiological imaging
 Contrast transfer function, in general imaging
 Controlled thermonuclear fusion
 CTF, an undocumented Windows protocol involved with the Microsoft Text Services Framework
 Cut-through forwarding, a methodology used in network hardware

Other uses 
 Canadian Television Fund
 Capture the flag, a traditional outdoor game often played by children
 Catford railway station (National Rail station code), London, England
 Coatepeque Airport (IATA code), Guatemala
 Colorado tick fever
 Controlled Traffic Farming, a soil protection driving strategy
 Correctional Training Facility at Soledad, California
 Counter terrorism financing
 Commander, Task force